Tonalá is one of the 119 municipalities of Chiapas, in southern Mexico.

As of 2010, the municipality had a total population of 84,594, up from 78,438 as of 2005. It covers an area of 1766.2 km².

As of 2010, the city of Tonalá had a population of 35,322. Other than the city of Tonalá, the municipality had 960 localities, the largest of which (with 2010 populations in parentheses) were: Paredón (6,126), Tres Picos (4,403), Cabeza de Toro (3,413), classified as urban, and Manuel Ávila Camacho (Ponte Duro) (1,778), Ignacio Ramírez (1,689), Huizachal (1,421), Doctor Belisario Domínguez (La Barra) (1,043), San Luqueño (1,016), and Morelos (Mojarras) (1,010), classified as rural.

See also 
 Feast of Saint Francis

References

Municipalities of Chiapas